Stehplatz.81 was the first EP recorded by William Johansson. It took almost 3 months to complete. According to the artist this album is about: "The Time, The Exposure, The Emotion, The Evolution, The Truth and The Unknown."

Track listing
 "Millennium" – 4:19
 "Freakshow" – 3:05
 "If you want my love" – 3:32
 "Metropolis" – 3:30
 "The Children of the Night" – 3:49
 "Stranger" – 3:56

Singles
 Millennium (16 November 2005)
 Freakshow (18 December 2005)
 The Children of the Night (Never released)

Synth-pop EPs
2005 EPs
William C. Woxlin albums